The Better with U Tour was the second concert tour by American boy band Big Time Rush. Visiting the United States and Canada, the tour supported the band's second studio album, Elevate.

Background
The band announced the tour November 2011, on On Air with Ryan Seacrest. The group stated the tour would be bigger, moving from the festival circuit, playing theaters and auditoriums. The tour also marks the band's first shows in Canada. The tour became a huge success, with shows selling out in seven major markets: Boston, Chicago, Washington, D.C., Detroit, New York City, Raleigh and Sacramento and the tour sold out in ten minutes. The band also played two festival shows, the Houston Rodeo and Mardi Gras at Universal Studios. Joining the band on tour was British-Irish boy band, One Direction, giving the band their first performances in the U.S.

Critical reception
The tour received positive reviews from music critics. Mark Lewis (American River Current) gave the show in Sacramento a rating of "love it" and said: "Put simply, BTR delivered on the hype that incited a crowd of young women to travel from as far as Fresno to catch a glimpse of their fresh-faced idols. Sacramento's Memorial Auditorium was filled to capacity over two hours before Kendall, James, Carlos and Logan took the stage". Carin Lane's (Times Union) eight-year-old son described the show in Albany as the "best night ever". She wrote: "These guys can sing and move, as the show was well-choreographed on a stage that included a massive, three-tiered scaffolding with ramps, a walkway, two towers and a trampoline".

Opening act
Jackson Guthy (select dates)
One Direction (select dates)
JoJo (Las Vegas, Los Angeles, San Jose, Sacramento, Broomfield)
McClain (Houston)

Setlist
"Big Time Rush"
"Time of Our Life"
"Nothing Even Matters"
"I Know You Know"
"No Idea"
"Love Me Love Me"
"If I Ruled the World"
"Superstar"
"Any Kind Of Guy"
"Invisible"
"Boyfriend"
"Cover Girl"
"I Wanna Hold Your Hand"
"Worldwide"
"Show Me"
"Music Sounds Better with U"
'Halfway There"
"Til I Forget About You"
Encore
"Elevate"
"City Is Ours"

Shows

External links
 Big Time Rush website

Notes

References

2012 concert tours
Big Time Rush concert tours